Yocasta Clara Brugal Mena is a Puerto Rican forensic pathologist and academic administrator. She is the president and dean of San Juan Bautista School of Medicine. Brugal leads the department of clinical pathology.

Brugal completed a M.D. at the University of Barcelona's  in 1971. She specializes in pathology and forensic pathology.

References 

Living people
Year of birth missing (living people)
University of Barcelona alumni
American forensic pathologists
Women pathologists
20th-century American women physicians
20th-century American physicians
21st-century American women physicians
21st-century American physicians
Puerto Rican women physicians
Heads of universities and colleges in the United States
Puerto Rican academics
Women forensic scientists
Women heads of universities and colleges